SBH can refer to:

 Stellar black hole or Supermassive black hole
 Gustaf III Airport, Saint Barthélemy, IATA code
 Sephardic Bikur Holim, a charity organisation
 Sequencing by hybridization, DNA sequencing method
 The Service Book and Hymnal of Lutheran churches
 Singapore Badminton Hall
 State Bank of Hyderabad